Cyclin-dependent kinase 1 also known as CDK1 or cell division cycle protein 2 homolog is a highly conserved protein that functions as a serine/threonine protein kinase, and is a key player in cell cycle regulation. It has been highly studied in the budding yeast S. cerevisiae, and the fission yeast S. pombe, where it is encoded by genes cdc28 and cdc2, respectively. With its cyclin partners, Cdk1 forms complexes that phosphorylate a variety of target substrates (over 75 have been identified in budding yeast); phosphorylation of these proteins leads to cell cycle progression.

Structure 

Cdk1 is a small protein (approximately 34 kilodaltons), and is highly conserved.  The human homolog of Cdk1, CDK1, shares approximately 63% amino-acid identity with its yeast homolog. Furthermore, human CDK1 is capable of rescuing fission yeast carrying a cdc2 mutation.  Cdk1 is comprised mostly by the bare protein kinase motif, which other protein kinases share.  Cdk1, like other kinases, contains a cleft in which ATP fits.  Substrates of Cdk1 bind near the mouth of the cleft, and Cdk1 residues catalyze the covalent bonding of the γ-phosphate to the oxygen of the hydroxyl serine/threonine of the substrate.

In addition to this catalytic core, Cdk1, like other cyclin-dependent kinases, contains a T-loop, which, in the absence of an interacting cyclin, prevents substrate binding to the Cdk1 active site.  Cdk1 also contains a PSTAIRE helix, which, upon cyclin binding, moves and rearranges the active site, facilitating Cdk1 kinase activities.

Function 

When bound to its cyclin partners, Cdk1 phosphorylation leads to cell cycle progression.  Cdk1 activity is best understood in S. cerevisiae, so Cdk1 S. cerevisiae activity is described here.

In the budding yeast, initial cell cycle entry is controlled by two regulatory complexes, SBF (SCB-binding factor) and MBF (MCB-binding factor).  These two complexes control G1/S gene transcription; however, they are normally inactive.  SBF is inhibited by the protein Whi5; however, when phosphorylated by Cln3-Cdk1, Whi5 is ejected from the nucleus, allowing for transcription of the G1/S regulon, which includes the G1/S cyclins Cln1,2. G1/S cyclin-Cdk1 activity leads to preparation for S phase entry (e.g., duplication of centromeres or the spindle pole body), and a rise in the S cyclins (Clb5,6 in S. cerevisiae).  Clb5,6-Cdk1 complexes directly lead to replication origin initiation; however, they are inhibited by Sic1, preventing premature S phase initiation.

Cln1,2 and/or Clb5,6-Cdk1 complex activity leads to a sudden drop in Sic1 levels, allowing for coherent S phase entry.  Finally, phosphorylation by M cyclins (e.g., Clb1, 2, 3 and 4) in complex with Cdk1 leads to spindle assembly and sister chromatid alignment.  Cdk1 phosphorylation also leads to the activation of the ubiquitin-protein ligase APCCdc20, an activation which allows for chromatid segregation and, furthermore, degradation of M-phase cyclins.  This destruction of M cyclins leads to the final events of mitosis (e.g., spindle disassembly, mitotic exit).

Regulation 
Given its essential role in cell cycle progression, Cdk1 is highly regulated.  Most obviously, Cdk1 is regulated by its binding with its cyclin partners.  Cyclin binding alters access to the active site of Cdk1, allowing for Cdk1 activity; furthermore, cyclins impart specificity to Cdk1 activity.  At least some cyclins contain a hydrophobic patch which may directly interact with substrates, conferring target specificity.  Furthermore, cyclins can target Cdk1 to particular subcellular locations.

In addition to regulation by cyclins, Cdk1 is regulated by phosphorylation.  A conserved tyrosine (Tyr15 in humans) leads to inhibition of Cdk1; this phosphorylation is thought to alter ATP orientation, preventing efficient kinase activity.  In S. pombe, for example, incomplete DNA synthesis may lead to stabilization of this phosphorylation, preventing mitotic progression.  Wee1, conserved among all eukaryotes phosphorylates Tyr15, whereas members of the Cdc25 family are phosphatases, counteracting this activity.  The balance between the two is thought to help govern cell cycle progression. Wee1 is controlled upstream by Cdr1, Cdr2, and Pom1.

Cdk1-cyclin complexes are also governed by direct binding of Cdk inhibitor proteins (CKIs).  One such protein, already discussed, is Sic1.  Sic1 is a stoichiometric inhibitor that binds directly to Clb5,6-Cdk1 complexes.  Multisite phosphorylation, by Cdk1-Cln1/2, of Sic1 is thought to time Sic1 ubiquitination and destruction, and by extension, the timing of S-phase entry.  Only until Sic1 inhibition is overcome can Clb5,6 activity occur and S phase initiation may begin.

Interactions 
Cdk1 has been shown to interact with:

 BCL2,
 CCNB1,
 CCNE1,
 CDKN3
 DAB2,
 FANCC,
 GADD45A,
LATS1,
 LYN,
 P53, and
 UBC.

See also 

 E2F#E2F.2FpRb complexes
 Hyperphosphorylation
 cdc25
 Maturation promoting factor
 CDK
 cyclin A
 cyclin B
 cyclin D
 cyclin E
 Wee (cell cycle)

Mastl

References

Further reading

External links 
 

Cell cycle
Proteins
EC 2.7.11
Cell cycle regulators

de:Cyclin-abhängige Kinase 1#Die Entdeckung des cdc2-Gens